Michael David Kirchmann (born July 5, 1972) is an American real estate developer, architect, designer and the founder and CEO of New York real estate firm GDSNY. His firm has designed and developed 4.7 million square feet of space in New York City. Assets include high-end residential and class A office buildings and commercial office properties such as 1245 Broadway, which is the headquarters for A24 Films, 28&7, 25 Mercer Street in SoHo, 177 Franklin Street in TriBeCa which is the New York Shinola flagship and headquarters, and the Emerson at 500 West 25th Street, adjacent to the High Line. The firm is currently developing class A office buildings at 120 Tenth Avenue and 417 Park Avenue. Kirchmann's firm has also designed and renovated more than 4,000 units of affordable housing in New York City that have been completed by other developers, including Campos Plaza in the East Village, Bronxchester Houses and Baychester Houses in The Bronx, Marcus Garvey Village in Brooklyn, and Arverne View in Rockaway, Queens.

Formerly a Design Director at architecture firm Skidmore, Owings, and Merrill, Kirchmann worked on projects across the United States, Europe, the United Kingdom, the Middle East, and Asia.

Career
In 1997, he joined SOM in New York City, where he became a Director of the New York office.
 Notable completed projects include the corporate headquarters of Oracle in Paris, the Arcapita headquarters in Bahrain, and the Park Hotel in Hyderabad, which is the first LEED Platinum certified hotel in India.

In 2007, and after a 10-year tenure at SOM, Kirchmann founded GDSNY, a real estate development, asset management, lending, and architecture firm with offices in New York. Notable projects at GDSNY include 1245 Broadway, 28&7, 407-417 Park Avenue, 120 Tenth Avenue, 177 Franklin Street, the Emerson, 149 Kent Avenue in Williamsburg, Brooklyn, Baychester Houses in the Bronx, and the Dogpound gyms in New York and Los Angeles, and 25 Mercer Street in Manhattan.

Kirchmann is a frequent lecturer and juror at Harvard University, New York University, Cityscape, MIPIM, the Architectural Association, Parsons School of Design, and the University of Pennsylvania. He taught in the Masters of Science in Real Estate program at Columbia University from 2010 to 2015 with SOM partner Chris Cooper and Vishaan Chakrabarti.

Projects
Kirchmann has designed more than 4,000 units of low-income housing that have been completed in New York City, including the redevelopment at Arverne View (formerly known as Ocean Village) in Rockaway, Queens, a region that was devastated by Hurricane Sandy in 2012.

In 2015 Kirchmann designed the extensive façade renovation of the low income, 625-unit Marcus Garvey Village spread across nine city blocks, in the Brownsville section of Brooklyn. Originally designed in 1973 by Kenneth Frampton, the project achieved notability at the time for its innovative urban planning approach to low-rise, high-density affordable housing. The renovated property was awarded the Building Brooklyn Award for Affordable Housing Preservation and the Affordable Housing Magazine Award of Excellence.

In 2016 Kirchmann collaborated with Fabien Baron to design the Dogpound, an exclusive gym located in the West Village and reportedly frequented by Hollywood celebrities and Olympic athletes, including Tom Holland, Hugh Jackman, Justin Bieber, Taylor Swift, Adriana Lima, Lewis Hamilton, and Kaia Gerber. Kirchmann went on to design the Dogpound in West Hollywood in 2019.

Kirchmann appeared in the 2017 season of Bravo’s Million Dollar Listing New York with real estate broker Fredrik Eklund, who shows several units from Kirchmann's sold-out development at 25 Mercer Street.

Prior to starting renovation work on 25 Mercer Street for what would eventually become a luxury condominium development in two historic cast-iron buildings in SoHo, Kirchmann collaborated with British artist Shantell Martin, who installed drawings on two floors of the buildings, as well as light artist Matthew Schreiber, American Ballet Theatre dancer Kathryn Boren, and fashion photographer Nigel Barker. Some of Martin's drawings remained intact throughout construction and became part of the foundation of the building.

GDSNY
 1245 Broadway, New York, New York (2021)
 205 West 28th Street, New York, New York (2022)
 120 10th Avenue, New York, New York (2025)
 407-417 Park Avenue, New York, New York (2026)
 The Emerson at 500 West 25th Street, West Chelsea, New York (2021)
 The DOGPOUND, West Village, New York (2016)
 The DOGPOUND, West Hollywood, California (2019)
 177 Franklin Street, Tribeca, New York City (2012)
 Baychester Houses, The Bronx, New York (2021)
 Marcus Garvey Apartments, Brownsville, Brooklyn, New York (2015)
 Arverne View, Far Rockaways, Queens, New York (2015)
 25–27 Mercer Street SoHo, New York City (2017)
 149 Kent Avenue, Williamsburg, New York (2016)
 Campos Plaza, East Village, New York (2016)
 Bronxchester, Bronx, New York (2016)

Skidmore, Owings and Merrill
 Portes de la Defense, Oracle Headquarters, Paris, France
 Arcapita Bank Headquarters, Manama, Bahrain
 The Park Hotel, Hyderabad, India
 The Four Seasons Hotel, Manama, Bahrain
 Defense Plaza, Paris, France
 Arcs de Seine, Paris, France

See also
Roger Duffy
T. J. Gottesdiener
David Childs
Fabien Baron
Kirk Myers

References

External links
 GDSNY official website

21st-century American architects
21st-century South African architects
South African emigrants to the United States
1972 births
Living people
20th-century American architects
20th-century South African architects
Architects from New York City
New York University alumni
University of Cape Town alumni
People from Johannesburg